, originally titled , is a Japanese manga series written and illustrated by Mitsuteru Yokoyama. It was serialized in Shueisha's monthly Ribon magazine from July 1966 to October 1967. Its 1966 anime adaptation was one of the most popular magical girl series of what would eventually become a genre in Japan. Due to its characteristics, it may be considered the first shōjo anime as well; while titles such as Himitsu no Akko-chan predate Sally in manga form, the Sally anime predates Himitsu no Akko-chan, which came out in 1969.

Story
Sally is the witch princess of the Magic Kingdom who longs to visit the mortal realm, presumably to make friends her own age. One day, by mistake, Sally teleports to the "mid world" (Earth), where she uses her magic to fend off a couple of burglars menacing two schoolgirls. Immediately befriended by her new acquaintances — tomboyish Yoshiko Hanamura (known affectionately as "Yotchan") and girly Sumire Kasugano — Sally decides to stay on Earth indefinitely, leading to mischief. Sally tries to keep her supernatural abilities secret, assuming the role of a human child.

In the final episode of the anime, Sally's grandma informs her she must return to the Magic Kingdom. Before leaving, Sally tries to tell her friends about her origins, but no one will believe her. Then her elementary school catches on fire, and Sally uses her magic to put it out. Her powers thus exposed, Sally's time to leave has finally come. She waves farewell to her friends, and returns to the Magic Kingdom.

Characters
  (Voiced by: Michiko Hirai (1966 series), Yuriko Yamamoto (1989 series)) The main character of the series. Sally is the daughter of the King and the Queen, and therefore princess of the Magic Kingdom. Yumeno means "dream field" but is a homophone to "a dream of" in Japanese; her full name, spoken in the Japanese name order, means "Dream of Sally".
  (Voiced by: Midori Kato (1st) Teiyū Ichiryūsai (2nd)) One of Sally's best friends in the mortal realm. Yoshiko is a tomboy. Sally usually refers to her as "Yotchan."
  (Voiced by: Mariko Mukai (1st) Nana Yamaguchi (2nd)) Another of Sally's human friends, she has a girly personality in contrast to Yoshiko.
  (Voiced by: Sachiko Chijimatsu) Sally's magical, shape-changing assistant. His first appearance was a crow before Sally's Dad sent him to Earth to retrieve her. Assuming the form of a five-year-old boy, Cub poses as Sally's younger brother. Cub is mischievous, usually playing pranks on Sally and friends or triggering unpredictable situations. However, his level of mischief has been on par with the Hanamura Triplets and Poron. 
Incorrigible boys adept at landing themselves in trouble.
  (Voiced by: Fuyumi Shiraishi) A little witch girl who appears in the later part of series. Saucy, selfish and rather lovable, she frequently casts spells she can't reverse, such as shrinking herself down to mouse-size, then being unable to "grow up."
  (Voiced by: Kosei Tomita) Sally's paternal grandfather. An original character to the anime. He also wears a horned hairstyle similar to Sally's father. He has a magical horned staff, which Poron stole to cause mischief with Cub and the Hanamura triplets on Earth.
  The ruler of the Magic Kingdom. A pompous blowhard who dislikes humanity on principle, he nonetheless has a good heart where his daughter is concerned (a quality shared with Endora from Bewitched.) He wears a distinguished horned hairstyle. 
  (Voiced by: Mariko Mukai (1st) Nana Yamaguchi (2nd))Queen of the Magic Kingdom. She's friendly, modest, a dutiful wife and a devoted mother, holding firmly the head of the King. She appears to be always knitting.

Release
Written and illustrated by Mitsuteru Yokoyama, Sally the Witch, was serialized in Shueisha's monthly Ribon magazine from July 1966 to October 1967. It was originally titled Sunny the Witch, before being changed as Sony owns the trademark to "Sunny". The series was inspired by the American TV sitcom, Bewitched (known in Japan as Oku-sama wa Majo, or The Missus is a Witch).

Susumu Yoshikawa created a manga for Pyonpyon and Gakushū Zasshi that coincided with the 1989 anime adaptation.

Anime
The first 17 episodes of the original 1960s TV series were filmed in black and white, and the remainder of the series was filmed in color, making it one of the earliest color anime. Black-and-white and color versions exist of the opening animation sequence.

Being so popular in Japan, a second series was produced 20 years later. The second series continues a few years after the original ending, and finishes with the original video animation Sally the Witch: Mother's Love is Eternal, in which, at the end, Sally finally becomes the ruler Queen of the Magic Kingdom, but worries about leaving her friends behind.

Episode list

Mahōtsukai Sally
Mahōtsukai Sally runs half hour per episode and has 109 episodes.

Mahōtsukai Sally 2
Mahōtsukai Sally 2 runs half hour per episode and has 88 episodes.

History and legacy
Sally the Witch was one of the first ongoing anime series produced. The series was originally in black and white but due to its success, later episodes were produced in color. The anime series was produced and aired from 1966 to 1968 in Japan by Toei Animation. Unlike Yokoyama's Tetsujin 28-go, the series never received a U.S. broadcast, but was aired in other several countries under different names: in Italy (Sally la Maga), French-speaking Canada (Minifée), Poland (Sally Czarodziejka — based on the Italian version), México and South America (Bolivia, Chile, Paraguay, and Peru) as La princesa Sally. Depending on the country, she is called Princess, Magician or Witch.

A second Sally the Witch anime, also made by Toei, aired for 88 episodes on Japanese TV from 1989 to 1991. It was released in French (Sally la Petite Sorcière), Italian (Un regno magico per Sally), Polish (Sally Czarownica), Spanish (Sally la Brujita) and Russian (Ведьма Салли). The 1989 series is a sequel to the original, in which an older Sally returns to the human world, reunites with her old friends, and embarks on a new round of magical adventures.

The main strength of Sally the Witch lays in its strong characterizations and detailed continuity. The basic storyline would be incorporated into many later magical girl TV anime shows and manga, particularly the concept of a magical princess relocating to the human world. Toei Animation reutilized the same concept in Mahō Tsukai Chappy, 1972, and Majokko Megu-chan, 1974, but later become a recurrent basis for the magical girl theme, with later unrelated characters such as Sailor Moon, or even foreign productions such as LoliRock or Star vs. the Forces of Evil using the same basic plot.

In popular culture
Author Robert Jay Lifton stated that Sally Yumeno "has long been one of the most popular of all manga and animation characters." Sally made an appearance as the character "Sunny the Magician" in the Giant Robo (OVA) series homaging and featuring characters and elements from many of Yokoyama's works.

In December 1994 police found a pamphlet at the headquarters of Aum Shinrikyo which included a song called "Sarin the Magician," a parody of the theme song of Sally the Witch. Lifton said that Sally "was undoubtedly a prominent figure in the childhoods of leading Aum members."

In 2015, the Japanese idol girl group Angerme released a new updated upbeat dance version of the original anime opening from the first series.

References

External links

 Toei website about Sally, the Witch 
 

1966 anime television series debuts
1966 manga
1989 anime television series debuts
1990 anime films
Comedy anime and manga
Magical girl anime and manga
Witchcraft in anime and manga
Mitsuteru Yokoyama
Shōjo manga
Shueisha franchises
Films about witchcraft
Television series about witchcraft
Toei Animation television
TV Asahi original programming
Television series about princesses
Witchcraft in written fiction